The 1974 Cork Senior Hurling Championship was the 86th staging of the Cork Senior Hurling Championship since its establishment by the Cork County Board in 1887. The championship began on 14 April 1974 and ended on 15 September 1974.

Blackrock entered the championship as the defending champions.

The final was played on 15 September 1974 at the Mardyke  Grounds in Cork, between St. Finbarr's and Blackrock, in what was their first meeting in the final in three years. St. Finbarr's won the match by 2-17 to 2-14 to claim their 18th championship title overall and a first title in six years.

Imokilly's Willie Glavin was the championship's top scorer with 4-14.

Team changes

To Championship

Promoted from the Cork Intermediate Hurling Championship
 Cloughduv

From Championship

Regraded to the Cork Intermediate Hurling Championship
 St. Vincent's

Results

First round

Second round

Quarter-finals

Semi-finals

Final

Championship statistics

Top scorers

Top scorers overall

Top scorers in a single game

Miscellaneous

 The semi-final between Blackrock and Nemo Rangers is the last championship game played at the Cork Athletic Grounds.
 The final was played at the Mardyke due to the construction of the new Páirc Uí Chaoimh

References

Cork Senior Hurling Championship
Cork Senior Hurling Championship